Cyperus chevalieri is a species of sedge that is endemic to Africa.

The species was first formally described by the botanist Georg Kükenthal in 1936.

See also
 List of Cyperus species

References

chevalieri
Plants described in 1936
Flora of the Democratic Republic of the Congo
Flora of Chad
Taxa named by Georg Kükenthal